Raw Wind in Eden is a 1958 American CinemaScope South Seas film noir directed by Richard Wilson and starring Esther Williams, Jeff Chandler.

Plot
Frustrated while having a fling with a married man, fashion model Laura is persuaded to fly in playboy Wally Drucker's private plane to a party aboard a yacht. The plane crashes near a small Mediterranean island, where a man named Moore, the native Urbano, and the latter's daughter, Costanza, seem to be the only people there.

Laura is unhurt but Wally's injuries are treated by Moore, a former World War II medic. Moore is vague about his past or why he is living in this solitary fashion. Laura's interest in him makes Drucker jealous and irritates Costanza, who is herself desired by an older man from a nearby island who wishes to marry her.

A beached yacht belonging to Moore is found. It turns out he was a wealthy man from North Carolina suspected of murdering his wife, who drunkenly fell from the boat and drowned. Moore gave his millions to charity and dropped out of sight. Moore must fight the other men for Laura, who then persuades him to sail back to America and begin a new life.

Cast
 Esther Williams as Laura
 Jeff Chandler as Mark Moore / Scott Moorehouse
 Rossana Podestà as Costanza Verno
 Carlos Thompson as Wally Drucker
 Rik Battaglia as Gavino
 Eduardo De Filippo as Urbano Verno

Production
The film was originally known as The Islander.

John Gavin was meant to appear in the film. Accordingly, he was replaced on The Female Animal by George Nader. However, Gavin did not make the cast.

Filming started in Italy in June 1957. It was shot off the Tuscan coast between Rome and Pisa.

It was the last film made by William Alland under his long term arrangement with Universal.

See also
 List of American films of 1958

References

External links
 
 
 

1958 films
Film noir
1958 drama films
Films set in Italy
Films set on islands
Films set in the Mediterranean Sea
American drama films
Films directed by Richard Wilson (director)
Films scored by Hans J. Salter
1950s English-language films
1950s American films